The Taming of the Snood is a 1940 film directed by Jules White. It is the fifth short subject starring Buster Keaton made for Columbia Pictures.

Plot
Buster is the owner of "Keaton's Snappy Hats" hat shop.  While modeling hats for a customer, jewel thief Dorothy Appleby, a stolen ring is stuffed into his porkpie hat.  She convinces him she likes his hat and has it delivered to her apartment.  When Buster arrives, the maid Elsie Ames, winds up doing many stunts and pratfalls with Buster.  The jewel thief returns to her apartment and retrieves the ring and hides it on the leg of her parrot.  The parrot flies out the window and Buster and the maid go after it, eventually hanging from a flagpole and careening back into the apartment with the ring.  Detectives have caught up with the thief and the ring is promptly handed over to them.

Cast
 Buster Keaton as the shop owner
 Dorothy Appleby as Miss Wilson
 Elsie Ames as the maid Odette
 Richard Fiske as a detective
 Bruce Bennett as a detective

See also
 Buster Keaton filmography

External links

 The Taming of the Snood at the International Buster Keaton Society

References

1940 films
1940 comedy films
Columbia Pictures short films
American black-and-white films
Films directed by Jules White
American comedy short films
1940s English-language films
1940s American films